Coux-et-Bigaroque is a former commune in the Dordogne department in southwestern France. On 1 January 2016, it was merged into the new commune Coux-et-Bigaroque-Mouzens.

Population

History
In 1825, the former communes of Coux and Bigaroque merged into Coux-et-Bigaroque.

See also
Communes of the Dordogne department

References

Former communes of Dordogne